Manfred was the first Judge of Gallura. He was probably a client of the Republic of Pisa. His predecessor may have been Saltaro. He was succeeded by Baldo.

Sources
Manno, Giuseppe (1835). Storia di Sardegna. P.M. Visaj.

Judges (judikes) of Gallura
11th-century Italian nobility